Duke Charles Louis Frederick of Mecklenburg-Strelitz (23 February 1708 – 5 June 1752) was a member of the Strelitz branch of the House of Mecklenburg. He was the father to Charlotte, Queen of the United Kingdom and Hanover and Adolphus Frederick IV, Duke of Mecklenburg-Strelitz.

He was styled as the Prince of Mirow. He was not a reigning Duke of Mecklenburg-Strelitz, unlike his father and son.

Life
Charles was born in Strelitz, the second son and youngest child of Adolphus Frederick II, reigning Duke of Mecklenburg-Strelitz. His mother, Princess Christiane Emilie of Schwarzburg-Sondershausen, was the third wife of his father. Charles had one half-brother and one surviving half-sister, the children of his father's first marriage. He also had one full sister at the time of his birth, but she died as an infant when Charles was less than one year old.

Charles's father died when he was only three months old. His half-brother succeeded their father as Adolphus Frederick III, Duke of Mecklenburg-Strelitz, whereas Charles, as the younger son, inherited the commandries of Mirow and Nemerow. It was to the estate of Mirow that Charles's mother retired upon the death of her husband, and it was here that Charles was raised. He later attended the University of Greifswald in Pomerania.

In keeping with the custom of the times, Charles set out on a Grand tour of Europe in 1726, aged 18. He played the transverse flute well, and made it one of the aims of the tour to improve his knowledge and skill in music.  After visiting Geneva, Italy and France he went to Vienna and briefly entered the service of the Holy Roman Emperor as a Lieutenant Colonel before returning to Mirow.

After leaving the Army, Charles lived with his family in the castle of Mirow, spending most of his time managing his estates and attending to the education of his children. He lived at Mirow until his death there at the age of 44.

When his older half-brother, Adolphus Frederick III, died in December 1752 without a male heir, Charles Louis Frederick's son Adolf Friedrich was made the next Duke of Mecklenburg-Strelitz, reigning as Adolf Friedrich IV.

Family
Charles was married on 5 February 1735 in Eisfeld to Princess Elisabeth Albertine of Saxe-Hildburghausen, daughter of Ernest Frederick I, Duke of Saxe-Hildburghausen. She was regent to her son in 1752 and played a major part in the struggle for the throne at that time.

They had ten children, six of whom survived into adulthood:

Through his daughter Charlotte, Charles Louis Frederick is the ancestor of every British monarch beginning with George IV, who ascended the throne of the United Kingdom in 1820.

Ancestry

References

External links
 Schloss Mirow

House of Mecklenburg-Strelitz
People from Mecklenburg-Strelitz
1708 births
1752 deaths
People from Neustrelitz
Recipients of the Order of the White Eagle (Poland)
Military personnel from Mecklenburg-Western Pomerania
Sons of monarchs
Non-inheriting heirs presumptive